Vostochny Airport (translated as Eastern Airport) may refer to:

 Kursk Vostochny Airport in Kursk, Russia (IATA: URS, ICAO: UUOK)
 Ulan-Ude Vostochny Airport in Ulan-Ude, Russia
 Ulyanovsk Vostochny Airport in Ulyanovsk, Russia (IATA: ULY, ICAO: UWLW)
 Vitebsk Vostochny Airport in Vitebsk, Belarus (IATA: VTB, ICAO: UMII)
 Vostochny Airport (Amur Oblast) - Airport under construction in Vostochny Cosmodrome